Pilipino rock may refer to:

Pinoy rock or Filipino rock music.
Pilipino Rock, a track listed in Cicciput, a 2003 studio album by the Italian rock band Elio e le Storie Tese.